{{speciesbox
| image = Brachymeles bicolor (KU 330074) from mid-elevation, Mt. Cagua - ZooKeys-266-001-g053.jpg
| status = LC
| status_system = IUCN3.1
| status_ref=<ref name=iucn> Lorenzo, A., Brown, R. & Diesmos, A.C(2022). 'Brachymeles bicolor. The IUCN Red List of Threatened Species 2022 </ref>
| genus = Brachymeles
| species = bicolor
| authority = (Gray, 1845)
| synonyms = Senira bicolor Gray, 1845
| range_map = Brachymeles bicolor distribution (colored).png
| range_map_caption = 
}}Brachymeles bicolor'', common name two-colored short-legged skink, is a species of skink endemic to  Luzon, the Philippines. It is widely distributed through the island, at elevations of 250 to 850 m above sea level. However, its population is declining due to deforestation, and hence the species is classified as least concern by the IUCN.

References

Brachymeles
Reptiles of the Philippines
Endemic fauna of the Philippines
Fauna of Luzon
Taxa named by John Edward Gray
Reptiles described in 1845